Marc Lacelle (born March 8, 1958, in Montreal, Quebec) is a former Canadian football player who played with the Montreal Alouettes and the Montreal Concordes as a running back. Lacelle ran for 254 yards in his career on 69 attempts, scoring 2 rushing touchdowns. He also caught 26 passes for 230 yards and 3 receiving touchdowns and returned 12 kickoffs for 236 yards.

References 

Living people
1958 births
Canadian football people from Montreal
French Quebecers
Players of Canadian football from Quebec
Canadian football running backs
McGill Redbirds football players
Montreal Alouettes players
Montreal Concordes players